Frank McDowell Leavitt (1856–1928) was an American engineer and inventor. Leavitt devised one of the earliest machines for manufacturing tin cans and later invented the Bliss-Leavitt torpedo, the chief torpedo used by United States Navy in World War I. Leavitt was part of an emerging cadre of American engineers whose design feats were putting United States manufacturing might on the map at the dawn of the twentieth century.

Early life and career beginnings
Frank M. Leavitt was born at Athens, Ohio, on March 3, 1856, the son of Rev. John McDowell Leavitt, later president of Lehigh University, and his wife Bethia (Brooks) Leavitt of Cincinnati, Ohio. Leavitt married Ohio-born Gertrude Goodsell at Brooklyn, New York, on November 8, 1893, and settled in Brooklyn Heights, New York, where he pursued his career as an engineer. Within a decade of his marriage, Leavitt had patented an early – and lucrative – process to manufacture tin cans.

Bliss-Leavitt torpedo

By 1904, Leavitt had turned his attention to weaponry: he began working with the civilian contracting firm E. W. Bliss Company of Brooklyn to design a new type of torpedo. The recently concluded Russian-Japanese War had caught the attention of United States Naval officials, because both nation's fleets had lost most of their battleships to underwater explosives. The race was on to perfect the deadly armaments, and the United States Navy was becoming the world leader in torpedo technology.

Final years and legacy
Frank M. Leavitt, who served as chief engineer for the E. W. Bliss Company for many years, died at his home in Scarsdale, New York, on August 6, 1928. The Ohio-born inventor and his wife had no children. His sister Anna Goodrich Leavitt, who married USN Commander James C. Cresap, had a grandchild named in honor of the inventor: U.S. Navy Lieutenant Commander Frank McDowell Leavitt Davis, who graduated from the U.S. Naval Academy at Annapolis. Davis later commanded a naval torpedo bombing plane squadron in World War II, and perished while on duty in a crash off Malta in 1946. Frank McDowell Leavitt Davis is honored with a plinth at the Naval Academy cemetery, where he is interred. Frank M. L. Davis and his father, Lieutenant Ralph Otis Davis, were both assigned to the Navy submarine service.

See also
Bliss-Leavitt torpedo
E. W. Bliss Company 
John McDowell Leavitt

Further reading
 Hellions of the Deep: The Development of American Torpedoes in World War II, Robert Gannon, Penn State Press, 1996, 
 Iron Men and Tin Fish: The Race to Build a Better Torpedo During World War II, Anthony Newpower, Greenwood Publishing Group, 2006, 
 The Devil's Device: The Story of Robert Whitehead, Inventor of the Torpedo, Edwyn Gray, Published by Seeley, 1975,

References

External links
 Steam Pumping Engine, United States Patent Office, Frank M. Leavitt
 Steering Apparatus for Automobile Torpedoes, F. M. Leavitt, United States Patent Office, December 25, 1906
 Power Consumed in Propelling The Whitehead Torpedo at Various Speeds, Society of Naval Architects and Marine Engineers
 Newport and Navy Torpedoes: An Enduring Legacy, Mary Anne Cowell, Edward C. Whitman, GlobalSecurity.org
 The Bliss-Leavitt Line
 The History of the Torpedo and the Relevance to Today's U.S. Navy, Russell Thomas, Naval History Museum 

1856 births
1928 deaths
Leavitt family
People from Athens, Ohio
People from Brooklyn Heights
People from Scarsdale, New York
19th-century American engineers
American inventors
20th-century American engineers
Engineers from Ohio
Engineers from New York (state)